Sinān ibn al-Fatḥ was an Arab mathematician from Ḥarrān, who probably lived in the first half of the 10th century.

Ibn an-Nadīm lists the following works of his:
 Kitāb at-Taḫt fi l-ḥisāb al-hindī ("Book of the Table on the Indian Calculation")
 Kitāb al-Ğamʿ wa-t-tafrīq ("Book of Addition and Subtraction")
 Kitāb Šarḥ al-Ğamʿ wa-t-tafrīq ("Commentary on the Book of Addition and Subtraction")
 Kitāb Ḥisāb al-mukaʿʿabāt ("Book on the Cubic Calculation")
 Kitāb Šarḥ al-ğabr wa-l-muqābala li-l-Ḫwārizmī ("Commentary on the Book of Balancing and Restoration by al-Ḫwārizmī")

References 

10th-century mathematicians
Year of death unknown
Year of birth unknown
People from Harran
Mathematicians of the medieval Islamic world
10th-century Arabs